Abbasabad (also Romanized as ‘Abbāsābād; also known as Shūrābād) is a village in Qaen Rural District, in the Central District of Qaen County, South Khorasan Province, Iran. At the 2006 census, its population was 19, in 5 families.

References 

Populated places in Qaen County